Hart-Ransom Union School District was, in the 60s and 70s, a K-8 school district in Stanislaus County, California, historically known as Ransom School. The Modesto Bee occasionally reprints a news item from 1901 reporting that a criminal was gunned down by a sheriff on Ransom School's doorstep. Hart School was formerly located on Hart Road. Members of the Hart family still attended the school at least as recently as the mid-70s. Hart-Ransom Charter is a K-12 charter school that recently opened an online High School through Connections Academy. There are many extra-curricular activities that their students can participate in. They are a participant in Science Olympiad with an Elementary, Junior High, and a new High School team.

Hart-Ransom School is a K-8 school that has just won a new fitness center and well as a gym. The school was remodeled in 2006. The school has won the distinguished school Award in 1995 and 2012. Hart-Ransom school district is Hart-Ransom District and also has a charter school named Hart-Ransom Charter.

Administration

 Hart-Ransom School Principal: David Croy
 Hart-Ransom Academic Charter School Principal: Sean Greene
 Superintendent:  Matthew Shipley
 Executive Assistant to Superintendent: Debbie Phillips
 Chief Business Officer: Debra Silva
 Vice Principal & Athletic Director: Brian Martins

Clubs/Activities

 Yearbook
 Science Olympiad
 Student council
 PBIS
 The Good News club (Religious organization)
 After school program (Eagle's Nest)
 2’o clock Care
 Band
 Choir

Sports

 Soccer (6th-8th Co-Ed)
 Basketball (6th-8th)
 Baseball/Softball
 Volleyball (6th-8th)

References

External links
 

School districts in Stanislaus County, California